Getac is a Taiwanese multinational technology company that specializes in rugged computers, mobile video systems, mechanical components, automotive parts, and aerospace fasteners. Getac was established on 5 October 1989 as a joint venture with GE Aerospace. A subsidiary of the MiTAC-Synnex Group, Getac has been listed on the Taiwan Stock Exchange (TWSE: 3005) since 2002. Getac is one of the major suppliers of rugged computers.

History 
Getac was established on 5 October 1989 as a joint venture with GE Aerospace.

In 2009, Getac acquired Waffer Technology Corp., which resulted in Getac becoming the world's third largest aluminum-magnesium alloy producer and the leading supplier of seat belt spindles and spools.

In 2012, the company introduced the Getac Z710, the world's first rugged 7-inch Android tablet.

In 2018, the company expanded its video recording and software businesses with the acquisition of WHP Workflow Solutions Inc. and the formation of Getac Video Solutions.

In 2020, Getac was selected by BMW to provide rugged mobile devices for applications including R&D, production, warehouse logistics and workshop diagnostics.

In 2021, Getac was selected by the United States Air Force to provide rugged computers under the Client Computing Solutions Quantum Enterprise Buy (CCS-2 QEB) Program.

In April 2022, Getac announced a partnership with global restoration charity One Tree Planted as part of its Earth Day 2022 sustainability initiative. Getac’s goal is to plant 30,000 trees.

See also
 List of companies of Taiwan

External links

References 

1989 establishments in Taiwan
Companies established in 1989
Electronics companies of Taiwan
Multinational companies headquartered in Taiwan
Taiwanese brands